"Oxygen" is a song by Swedish singer-songwriter Winona Oak and German DJ and record producer Robin Schulz. The song was released as a digital download on 29 May 2020. The song was written by Sam McCarthy, Robin Schulz, Paul Vogler, Casey Smith, Winona Oak and Daniel Dust.

Background
Together with Spinnin' Records and his long-time label partner Warner Music Central Europe, Robin Schulz launched his own label called Mentalo Music. Schulz became the owner of the label at the end of May 2020, the label will establish new artists. "Oxygen" became the first single released under Mentalo Music.

Music video
The official music video of the song was released on 28 May 2020 through Robin Schulz's YouTube account. The music video was directed by Christophe Mentz and Nassim Maoui.

Track listing

Charts

References

2020 singles
2020 songs
Robin Schulz songs
Winona Oak songs
Songs written by Sam McCarthy
Songs written by Robin Schulz
Spinnin' Records singles